During the 1998–99 English football season, Crewe Alexandra F.C. competed in the Football League First Division, their 76th in the English Football League.

Season summary
In the 1998–99 season, Crewe had a disastrous first half of the campaign which saw them almost midway point at the bottom of the table with just 2 wins from 22 league games and 11 points from safety. Even though they managed to get another couple of wins together; by 20 February, Crewe were still bottom and 11 points from safety with 14 league matches remaining and their First Division status was in severe danger of being lost. From then on against the odds, Crewe went on a superb run of just 3 defeats from their remaining 14 league games, winning 7 of them on their way to completing the great escape, the key result being a 3–1 win against Portsmouth which saved them from the drop.

Final league table

Results
Crewe Alexandra's score comes first

Legend

Football League First Division

FA Cup

League Cup

Squad

Left club during the season

References

Crewe Alexandra F.C. seasons
Crewe Alexandra